Entoloma quadratum is a species of agaric fungus in the family Entolomataceae. The fungus was originally described as Agaricus quadratus by Miles Joseph Berkeley and Moses Ashley Curtis in 1859; Egon Horak transferred it to Entoloma in 1976. It is found in Africa, Asia, Europe, and North America.

References

External links

Entolomataceae
Fungi described in 1859
Fungi of Africa
Fungi of Asia
Fungi of Europe
Fungi of North America
Taxa named by Miles Joseph Berkeley
Taxa named by Moses Ashley Curtis